Nineteen Ninety Now is a collaborative album by Celph Titled and Buckwild. It was released on October 26, 2010.

Reception
Nineteen Ninety Now received critical acclaim from music critics. Nathan Rabin of The A.V. Club described Nineteen Ninety Now as "one of the tightest, funniest, and most consistent hip-hop albums of the year." In December 2010, it was named the "Slept-On" album of the year by HipHopDX.

Track listing
All tracks produced by Buckwild

Charts

References

External links
 

2010 albums
Celph Titled albums
Albums produced by Buckwild
Demigodz Records albums
Collaborative albums